Ken Flach and Robert Seguso were the defending champions but lost in the second round to Eliot Teltscher and Christo van Rensburg.
Second-seeded pair Hans Gildemeister and Andrés Gómez claimed the title by defeating John Alexander and Sherwood Stewart in the final.

Seeds
The top four seeds received a bye into the second round. A champion seed is indicated in bold text while text in italics indicates the round in which that seed was eliminated.

Draw

Finals

Top half

Bottom half

References

External links

1986 Grand Prix (tennis)
Men's Doubles